Huberia is a genus of ants in the subfamily Myrmicinae. The genus contains two species endemic to New Zealand.

Species
 Huberia brounii Forel, 1895
 Huberia striata (Smith, 1876)

References

External links

Myrmicinae
Ant genera
Ants of New Zealand
Endemic fauna of New Zealand
Endemic insects of New Zealand